The 2013–14 Lamar Cardinals basketball team represented Lamar University during the 2013–14 NCAA Division I men's basketball season. The Cardinals, led by third year head coach Pat Knight, played their home games at the Montagne Center and were members of the Southland Conference. They finished the season 4–26, 3–15 in Southland play to finish in 13th place. They failed to qualify for the Southland Conference tournament.

After starting the season 3–22, head coach Pat Knight was fired on February 16. He compiled a record of 29–62 in three years.  The Cardinals finished the season with Tic Price as interim head coach.  The Cardinals finished the season 1–4 under Coach Price.  Price was named head coach on March 18, 2014.

Roster

Schedule

|-
!colspan=12 style="" | Exhibition

|-
!colspan=12 style="" | Regular season

References

Lamar Cardinals basketball seasons
Lamar
Lamar Cardinals basketball
Lamar Cardinals basketball